Wyleyia is an extinct genus of birds, containing a single species, Wyleyia valdensis, known from the early Cretaceous period of Sussex, England. The genus is known from a single specimen, a damaged right humerus. It was named to honor J. F. Wyley, who found the specimen in Weald Clay deposits of Henfield in Sussex (England). The specific name valdensis means "from the Weald".

The bone was found in the Hastings Beds, a series of Valanginian deposits, dated to between 140 and 136 million years ago.

Sometimes believed to be from a non-avialan coelurosaur, it is now generally accepted as an early bird, although its exact systematic position is unresolved. It has been proposed to be an enantiornithine or an early neornithine palaeognathe. C.J.O. Harrison and C.A. Walker found it "advisable to consider the new genus incertae sedis until further evidence of affinity is forthcoming."

References

Cretaceous birds of Europe
Bird genera
Prehistoric birds of Europe
Taxa named by Cyril Walker
Taxa named by Colin Harrison
Prehistoric euornitheans